A fluent is a time-varying quantity or variable. The term was used by Isaac Newton in his early calculus to describe his form of a function. The concept was introduced by Newton in 1665 and detailed in his mathematical treatise, Method of Fluxions. Newton described any variable that changed its value as a fluent – for example, the velocity of a ball thrown in the air. The derivative of a fluent is known as a fluxion, the main focus of Newton's calculus. A fluent can be found from its corresponding fluxion through integration.

See also

Method of Fluxions
History of calculus
Leibniz–Newton calculus controversy
Derivative
Newton's notation
Fluxion

References

Mathematical analysis
Differential calculus
History of calculus